Thomas Lyle Martin Jr. (September 26, 1921 – October 8, 2009) served as president of the Illinois Institute of Technology (ITT) from 1974 to 1987.

Biography 

Martin was born on September 26, 1921, in Memphis, Tennessee. During the Second World War, he served in the US Army, rising to the rank of captain.

He received a bachelor's degree in electrical engineering from Rensselaer Polytechnic Institute in 1942 and a master's in 1948. He went on to obtain a PhD degree in electrical engineering from Stanford University. Prior to joining the Illinois Institute of Technology (IIT) administration, he served as dean of Engineering at the University of Arizona, the University of Florida and Southern Methodist University. He was a fellow of IEEE and a member of the U.S. National Academy of Engineering. He served as president of IIT from 1974 to 1987.

Martin died in Irving, Texas, on October 8, 2009.

References

1921 births
2009 deaths
Fellow Members of the IEEE
Illinois Institute of Technology faculty
Members of the United States National Academy of Engineering
Presidents of Illinois Institute of Technology
Southern Methodist University faculty
Stanford University alumni
University of Arizona faculty
University of Florida faculty
United States Army personnel of World War II
20th-century American academics